Tijuana Jazz is an album by American jazz vibraphonist Gary McFarland and trumpeter Clark Terry featuring performances recorded in 1965 for the Impulse! label. The album was also released in the UK on the HMV label as CLP3541.

Reception
The AllMusic review by Scott Yanow awarded the album 3 stars stating: "McFarland's arrangements are fine, but the solos are quite short, and the Mexican-flavored music is not particularly memorable. A blown opportunity".

Track listing
All compositions by Gary McFarland except as indicated
 "South of the Border" (Jimmy Kennedy, Michael Carr) - 2:06
 "Acapulco at Night" - 2:52
 "Fantastic, That's You" (George Cates, George Douglas) - 2:54
 "Limehouse Blues" (Philip Braham, Douglas Furber) - 3:37
 "Tijuana" (Cates, Douglas) - 2:09
 "Marcheta" (Victor Schertzinger) - 2:55
 "Granny's Samba" - 3:30
 "Soul Bird (Tin Tin Deo)" (Gil Fuller, Chano Pozo) - 4:01
 "Mexicali Rose" (Jack Tenney, Helen Stone) - 2:27
 "Ira Schwartz's Golden Dream" - 3:32
 "Mary Jane" - 3:05
 "Sweet Georgia Brown" (Ben Bernie, Kenneth Casey, Maceo Pinkard) - 2:06
Recorded in New York City on December 3, 1965 (tracks 1, 2, 6 & 9), December 6, 1965 (tracks 4, 8, 11 & 12), and December 7, 1965 (tracks 3, 5, 7 & 10)

Personnel
Gary McFarland – marimba, electric piano
Joe Newman, Clark Terry - trumpet, flugelhorn
Bob Brookmeyer – valve trombone
Toots Thielemans - harmonica, guitar
Barry Galbraith - guitar
Bob Bushnell – electric bass
Mel Lewis, Grady Tate – drums

References

 

Impulse! Records albums
Gary McFarland albums
Clark Terry albums
1965 albums
Albums produced by Bob Thiele